The Rudrón Valley is a valley of the province of Burgos, in the autonomous community of Castilla y León, Spain, that borders the autonomous community of Cantabria.

From a structural standpoint, the relief is organized around a large morphostructural unit: an extensive moorland. The River Rudrón divides and separates both sides of moorland. The River Rudrón  divides and separates both sides of moorland creating Rudrón Valley, leaving on the left the moor of La Lora and right the moor of Masa.

* Wikimapia- Valle del Rudrón

Geographical description

The River Rudrón through a process of epigenesis has excavated and drilled sedimentary limestones that extensive moorland, moorland that forms the watershed of this river. The River Rudrón rises in the land of the Tozo, specifically in the town of San Mames of Abar where it is called the River Urón. Collect water from some rivers of Tozo.

The valley is interrupted by having a special feature, become underground river between Basconcillos of Tozo and  the Barrio Panizares and where the river rises a second time. After millions of years the product of this erosion has generated the River Rudrón slopes and steep slopes, sometimes spectaculars. In the valley bottom lands dominated limestone, clay of Quaternary.

This erosion has also generated numerous springs, streams, fountains and creeks to break the different aquifers, in some cases spectacular as the  Blue Pit. The Blue Pit is one of the most visited places of Rudrón Valley.

In this valley villages are located: 
 Barrio Panizares 
 Hoyos del Tozo 
 Moradillo del Castillo
 Santa Coloma del Rudrón
 Bañuelos del Rudrón
 Tablada del Rudrón 
 Tubilla del Agua  
 Covanera 
 San Felices del Rudrón 
 Valdelateja

References

Further reading
Books.google.com

Valleys of Spain
Geography of the Province of Burgos
Landforms of Castile and León